Malcuit is a surname. Notable people with the surname include:

Kévin Malcuit (born 1991), French footballer
Samir Malcuit (born 1985), French footballer